Albert Francis Woodbury (July 1, 1909 – May 26, 1989) was an American composer and orchestrator. He was nominated for an Academy Award in the category Best Original Score for the film They Shoot Horses, Don't They?. Woodbury died in May 1989 of cancer in Los Angeles, California, at the age of 79.

Selected filmography 
 They Shoot Horses, Don't They? (1969; co-nominated with Johnny Green)

References

External links 

1909 births
1989 deaths
People from Los Angeles
Deaths from cancer in California
American male film score composers
American film score composers
American television composers
20th-century American composers